The Mindanao flying squirrel (Petinomys mindanensis) is a common species of squirrel that is endemic to the Philippines.

References

Mammals described in 1939
Petinomys